John Arthur Hickman (born September 10, 1959) is an American musician best known as the lead guitarist and co-founder of U.S. rock band Cracker.

Biography

Early years
Hickman is a native of Redlands in San Bernardino County in California's Inland Empire. Prior to his tenure in Cracker, Hickman had stints in various California bands including The Unforgiven and The Dangers. In the early 1990s, he co-founded Cracker with childhood friend, David Lowery. His often imitated signature sound, influenced by punk rock, surf guitar and "Bakersfield Country" sound, is played on a 1977 Les Paul guitar.

In addition to his role with Cracker, Hickman engages in solo work and various side projects such as the Hickman-Dalton Gang (a collaboration with Jim Dalton of Roger Clyne & The Peacemakers and The Railbenders), All Thumbs Trio (with Chuck Garvey and Gibb Droll) and Crazysloth, an Arizona-based band. He has one full film score to his credit (River Red (1998)), and several of the songs that he has co-written with David Lowery have been used in films.

In 2005, Hickman released his first solo album, Palmhenge. On July 3, 2012 he released his second solo album, Tilting.

Filmography
1994 The Cowboy Way - writer: "Blue Danube Blues"
1995 White Man's Burden - writer: "How Can I Live Without You"
1996 The Cable Guy - writer: "Get Outta My Head"
1998 Origin of the Species - writer: "I Hate My Generation"
1998 River Red - composer

References

External links

Cracker's official site
River Red (1998)

American rock guitarists
American male guitarists
Guitarists from California
1956 births
Living people
People from Greater Los Angeles
20th-century American guitarists
Cracker (band) members
20th-century American male musicians